Leşile may refer to several villages in Romania:

 Leşile, a village in Teiu Commune, Argeș County
 Leşile, a village in Șimnicu de Sus Commune, Dolj County

See also 
 Leșu (disambiguation)